George C. Marshall (1880–1959) was an American general, Chief of Staff of the United States Army, Secretary of State, President of the American Red Cross, and Secretary of Defense.

George Marshall may also refer to:

George Marshall (academic), principal of Trevelyan College, University of Durham
George Marshall (athlete) (1877–?), British runner
George Marshall (conservationist) (1904–2000), American conservationist and political activist
George Marshall (Victoria cricketer) (1829–1868), Australian cricketer who played for Victoria
George Marshall (Tasmania cricketer) (1832–1905), Australian cricketer who played for Tasmania
George Marshall (New Zealand cricketer) (1863–1907), New Zealand cricketer
George Marshall (environmentalist) (born 1964), British environmentalist
George Marshall (footballer, born 1869) (1869–1938), English footballer
George Marshall (footballer, born 1896) (1896–?), English footballer
George Marshall (MP), Member of Parliament (MP) for Boroughbridge 1614-1621
George Alexander Marshall (1851–1899), U.S. Representative from Ohio
George Marshall (director) (1891–1975), actor and director
George Marshall (philanthropist) (1753–1819), curate in Horsham, England
George Frederick Leycester Marshall (1843–1934), military officer and naturalist
George H. Marshall (1916–1984), British educator, campaigner and author
George Preston Marshall (1896–1969), American football team owner
George Sidney Marshall (1869–1956), 38th mayor of Columbus, Ohio
George William Marshall (1839–1905), English officer of arms
George Marshall (warden) (died 1658), English educational administrator
George Marshall (Jamaica), elected to the House of Assembly of Jamaica in 1820
G. M. Marshall (1834–1915), Wisconsin State Assemblyman
George C. Marshall High School (built: 1963), public high school in northern Virginia
George C. Marshall European Center for Security Studies (founded 1993), an institute for the study of military security

See also
Marshall Space Flight Center, a major center for NASA named after George C. Marshall
George C. Marshall Institute, a think-tank based in Washington, D.C.
George C. Marshall's Dodona Manor, the home of George C. Marshall open as a museum